The United States Olympic curling trials take place to decide the curling team to represent the United States at each Winter Olympics.

Past winners

Men

Women

Mixed doubles

References

External links 

United States Curling Association

 
Olympic